Silva Ridge is a ridge leading to the top of Sheehan Mesa, on the northeast side. Large silicified tree stumps in place of growth were found halfway up this ridge, hence named Silva by the Northern Party of New Zealand Geological Survey Antarctic Expedition (NZGSAE), 1962–63.

Ridges of Victoria Land
Pennell Coast